The Central Wales Challenge Cup  is a football knockout tournament involving teams from in North Wales who play in leagues administered and associated with the Central Wales Football Association.

Previous winners
Information sourced from Welsh Football Statistician.

1970s

1970–71: – Welshpool Town
1971–72: – Knighton Town
1972–73: – Barmouth & Dyffryn United
1973–74: – Welshpool Town
1974–75: – Newtown
1975–76: – Aberystwyth Town
1976–77: – Welshpool Town
1977–78: – Caersws
1978–79: – Presteigne St. Andrews
1979–80: – Welshpool Town

1990s

1980–81: – Newtown
1981–82: – Aberystwyth Town
1982–83: – Aberystwyth Town
1983–84: – Llanidloes Town
1984–85: – Aberystwyth Town
1985–86: – Presteigne St. Andrews
1986–87: – Aberystwyth Town
1989–88: – Aberystwyth Town
1988–89: – Caersws
1989–90: – Welshpool Town

1990s

1990–91: – Caersws
1991–92: – Caersws
1992–93: –
1993–94: – Welshpool Town
1994–95: –
1995–96: –
1996–97: – Rhayader Town
1999–98: – Aberystwyth Town
1998–99: – Welshpool Town
1999–2000: – Welshpool Town

2000s

2000–01: –  
2001–02: – Welshpool Town
2002–03: – CPD Penrhyncoch
2003–04: – Aberystwyth Town reserves
2004–05: – Presteigne St. Andrews
2005–06: – Guilsfield
2006–07: – Llanfyllin Town
2007–08: – Aberystwyth Town reserves
2008–09: – Newtown reserves
2009–10: – Waterloo Rovers

2010s

2010–11: – Caersws
2011–12: – CPD Penrhyncoch
2012–13: – Guilsfield
2013–14: – Llanfair United
2014–15: – Caersws
2015–16: – Carno
2016–17: – Aberaeron Town
2017–18: – Caersws
2018–19: – Berriew
2019–20: – Competition abandoned due to Coronavirus pandemic

2020s

2020–21: – No competition - Covid-19 pandemic
2021–22: – Llanidloes Town

References

Football cup competitions in Wales
County Cup competitions
Football in Wales